Aeolochroma intima is a moth of the family Geometridae first described by Louis Beethoven Prout in 1913. It is found on New Guinea.

References

External links

Pseudoterpnini
Moths described in 1913
Taxa named by Louis Beethoven Prout
Moths of New Guinea